Ramón "Chicho" Govantes Delgado (born 1880 - death date unknown) was a Cuban baseball outfielder in the Cuban League and Negro leagues. He played from 1900 to 1910 with several clubs, including San Francisco, Almendares club, Habana, Cuban Stars (West), and Club Fé.

References

External links

1870 births
Year of death missing
Cuban League players
Cuban baseball players
Cuban Stars (West) players
Habana players
Almendares (baseball) players
Club Fé players
San Francisco (baseball) players